Parc-d’Anxtot is a commune in the Seine-Maritime department in the Normandy region in northern France.

Geography
The A29 autoroute crosses the commune's southern border.

Population

Places of interest
 The church of St. Blaise, dating from the sixteenth century.

See also
Communes of the Seine-Maritime department

References

Communes of Seine-Maritime